Chang-dong is a dong, neighbourhood of Dobong-gu in Seoul, South Korea

Notable people
 Son Hyun-woo (Hangul: 손현우, born 1992), singer, dancer, actor, and member of Monsta X

See also 
Administrative divisions of South Korea

References

External links
Dongbong-gu map

Neighbourhoods of Dobong District